Robert Hewson Pruyn (February 14, 1815 – February 26, 1882) was an American lawyer, militia general, diplomat, and politician from Albany, New York.  He was most notable for his service as Speaker of the New York State Assembly, Adjutant General of New York, and United States Minister Resident to Japan.

Early life
Pruyn was born in Albany, New York, on February 14, 1815, the son of Casparus F. and Ann (née Hewson) Pruyn.  The Pruyn (pronounced "Prine") family of Albany, New York was one of the oldest and most esteemed Dutch families in New York, and at the time of Robert's birth there, had resided in Albany for over two centuries.

Pruyn graduated from The Albany Academy, and received Bachelor of Arts (1833) and Master of Arts (1836) degrees from Rutgers University. He studied law with Abraham Van Vechten, was admitted to the bar, and practiced in Albany.

Political, military, and diplomatic service
Pruyn served as Albany's corporation counsel and was a member of the city council. Active in the state militia, he was named Judge Advocate General in 1841, serving until 1846, and again in 1851.

A political ally and close friend to William Henry Seward, he was a Whig member of the New York State Assembly (Albany Co., 3rd D.) in 1848, 1849, 1850, 1851, 1852 and 1854. On January 30, 1850, after Speaker Noble S. Elderkin left the Assembly to stay at home with his wife who was terminally ill, Pruyn was elected Speaker pro tempore. He was again Speaker in 1854.

Pruyn was an experienced militia officer, including service as the state judge advocate general.  In 1855, Governor Myron Clark appointed him Adjutant General of the New York National Guard, replacing John Watts de Peyster. He achieved the rank of brigadier general of the militia, and was succeeded as adjutant general by Frederick Townsend.

At the personal request of Seward, who was then Secretary of State, President Abraham Lincoln appointed him Minister to Japan in 1861, and he served in that capacity until 1865, when he returned to New York. Japan–United States relations had only recently been established with the visits by Commodore Perry in 1852 to 1854.

Pruyn's crowning achievement was the successful negotiation following the Shimonoseki bombardment. He was considered highly successful in his dealings with the shōgun.  He also signed an agreement to allow shipwrecked Japanese sailors to be repatriated.

Later career
He was awarded an LL.D. from Williams College in 1865 and served on the board of trustees. He went on to become president of the National Commercial Bank and Trust of Albany, and was one of the founders of Albany Law School.

In 1866, he was the unsuccessful Conservative Union candidate for Lieutenant Governor of New York along with gubernatorial candidate, John T. Hoffman, who was then the mayor of New York City.

In the Summer of 1869, he was illegally arrested with other Albany and Susquehanna Railroad executive members during Jay Gould and Jim Fisk's attempt to buy the railroad.

Personal life
In 1841, Pruyn married Jane Ann Lansing (1811–1886), a member of another prominent Albany family.  Her father, Gerrit Yates Lansing, was a U.S. Representative who served as the chancellor of the University of the State of New York.  Together, Robert and Jane were the parents of four children, including:

 Edward Pruyn (1843–1862)
 Robert Clarence Pruyn (1847–1934), who was a prominent banker and leader of the American toy industry.
 Helen Lansing Pruyn (1849–1854)
 Charles Lansing Pruyn (1852–1906)

He died suddenly in 1882 in Albany.  His remains are interred at Albany Rural Cemetery, Section 30, Lot 14.

Electoral history

Notes

References
Allaben, Frank. John Watts de Peyster. Frank Allaben Genealogical Company: New York, 1908. 
Findling, John. Dictionary of American Diplomatic History. Greenwood Press: Westport, 1989. 
Hutchins, S.C. Civil List and Forms of Government of the Colony State of New York. Weed, Parsons & Co.: Albany, 1870.
Johnson, Rossiter, and Brown, John Howard. The twentieth-century biographical dictionary of notable Americans. The Biographical Society: Boston. 1904.
Shavit, David. The United States in Asia: A Historical Dictionary. Greenwood Press: Westport. 1990. 
Seward, Frederick W. Autobiography of William H. Seward, from 1801 to 1834. D. Appleton: New York. 1877.
Stern, Philip Van Doren.  When the Guns Roared: World Aspects of the American Civil War. Doubleday: New York, 1965.
Treat, Payson Jackson. The Early Diplomatic Relations Between the United States and Japan, 1853-1865. The Johns Hopkins Press: Baltimore, 1917.

Further reading
American Council of Learned Societies. "Dictionary of American Biography". Charles Scribner's Sons: New York. 1959.
Lee, Edwin B. "Robert H. Pruyn in Japan, 1862–1865". New York History 66 (1985) pp. 123–39.
Robert H. Pruyn Papers, Albany Institute of History and Art, Albany, N.Y.
"Friends of Pruyn House web site "

External links
Political Graveyard, Pruyn, Robert Hewson (1815-1882).
Papers relating to the foreign relations of the United States.
Pruyn House, Diane Morgan Curator 207 Old Niskayuna Road P.O. Box 212 Newtonville, NY 12128.

S. Fessler, " The Letters of Robert Hewson Pruyn" (2022). East Asian Studies Faculty Scholarship. 19.

1815 births
1882 deaths
Ambassadors of the United States to Japan
Lawyers from Albany, New York
Politicians from Albany, New York
Military personnel from Albany, New York
The Albany Academy alumni
Rutgers University alumni
American militia generals
New York (state) Whigs
New York (state) lawyers
Speakers of the New York State Assembly
Republican Party members of the New York State Assembly
Burials at Albany Rural Cemetery
19th-century American diplomats
19th-century American lawyers
19th-century American politicians
Lansing family
Pruyn family